Pandin may refer to several places in Burma:

Pandin, Banmauk
 Pandin, Shwegu